The Elzbach (also: Elz) is a small river in Rhineland-Palatinate, Germany, a left tributary of the Moselle. It rises in the Eifel, near Kelberg. The Elz flows through Monreal and past Eltz Castle. It flows into the Moselle in Moselkern, in the Verbandsgemeinde of Cochem.

Rivers of Rhineland-Palatinate
Rivers of the Eifel
Rivers of Germany